Suzanna Wibowo (born 25 November 1963) is a former professional tennis player from Indonesia. She is sometimes known by her maiden name Suzanna Anggarkusuma.

She first represented Indonesia in the Fed Cup in 1981. She made her debut as a professional in July 1986, aged 22, in the doubles competition of an ITF tournament in Brindisi, Italy, which she and partner Yayuk Basuki won. She played her last professional tournament in June 2006 in New Delhi at the age of 43.

She was part of Indonesia's Fed Cup team in 1981, 1982, 1983, 1984, 1985, 1986, 1987, 1988, 1989, 1990, 1991, 1992, 1993 and 2003.

Wibowo won the gold medal in the women's doubles at the 1986 Asian Games and 1990 Asian Games, partnered both times with Yayuk Basuki. She also won the bronze medal in the mixed doubles at both of those tournaments.

Through 1991, she qualified for the main draw in the women's doubles at the Australian Open and French Open, and both the women's doubles and mixed doubles at Wimbledon, but did not proceed past the first round in any of these competitions.

Wibowo represented Indonesia at the 1992 Summer Olympics at Barcelona.

She is married to fellow former professional tennis player Tintus Wibowo. Together they won the bronze medal in mixed doubles at the 1986 Asian Games. Both now are professional tennis coaches. They are the parents of Ayrton Wibowo, who is a professional player and part of Indonesia's 2008 Davis Cup team.

WTA career finals

Doubles: 1 (1 title)

ITF Circuit finals

Singles: 7 (3–4)

Doubles: 29 (22–7)

External links
 
 

Indonesian female tennis players
1963 births
Living people
Asian Games medalists in tennis
Tennis players at the 1982 Asian Games
Tennis players at the 1986 Asian Games
Tennis players at the 1990 Asian Games
Asian Games gold medalists for Indonesia
Asian Games silver medalists for Indonesia
Asian Games bronze medalists for Indonesia
Medalists at the 1986 Asian Games
Medalists at the 1990 Asian Games
Southeast Asian Games gold medalists for Indonesia
Southeast Asian Games silver medalists for Indonesia
Southeast Asian Games bronze medalists for Indonesia
Southeast Asian Games medalists in tennis
Competitors at the 1981 Southeast Asian Games
20th-century Indonesian women